eMovies is a 24-hour South African digital satellite television free-to-air movie channel created  and owned by eMedia Investment's e.tv for the Openview platform. eMovies Extra is a sister companion channel.

History
The network launched on 16 October 2013, with a second "Extra" channel launched in 2016 via OpenView. Both networks were added on 17 May 2017 on DStv, along with the rest of the e.tv family of networks.

Both channels were going to be removed from DStv along with eExtra and eToonz on April 1, 2022 but the channels remained on DStv for another 2 months as the eMedia Investments filed an application to the Competition Tribunal regarding their carriage agreement with MultiChoice.

By the end of May 2022, eMovies and eMovies Extra ceased transmission on DStv alongside eToonz and eExtra. The channel was supplemented by KIX and upcoming movie channel titled Movie Room.

In August 2022, eExtra alongside eMovies, eMovies Extra and eToonz were reinstated on the DStv platform for another 6 months following pending investigation.

References

External links

Television channels and stations established in 2013
Television channels and stations established in 2016
Television stations in South Africa